Crepidochares neblinae is a moth in the Eriocottidae family. It was described by Davis in 1990. It is found in Venezuela.

Etymology
The species is named for Cerro de la Neblina, the type locality.

References

Moths described in 1990
Eriocottidae
Moths of South America